Argentina Squash Rackets Association ("Asociación Argentina de Squash Rackets" in Spanish), is the governing body of squash federations and clubs in Argentina.

External links
 Official site

See also
 Argentina men's national squash team

Squash
National members of the World Squash Federation
Squash in Argentina